Haplidus mandibularis is a species of beetle in the family Cerambycidae. It was described by Chemsak and Linsley in 1963.

References

Hesperophanini
Beetles described in 1963